Azeri–Chirag–Gunashli (ACG) or Azeri–Chirag–Deepwater Gunashli is a complex of oil fields in the Caspian Sea, about  off the coast of Azerbaijan. It consists of the Azeri and Chirag oil fields, and the deepwater portion of the Gunashli oil field. It is developed by the Azerbaijan International Operating Company, a consortium of international oil companies, and operated by BP on behalf of the consortium. As of 2021, ACG oil accounted for 95% of all Azerbaijani oil exports.

BP reports that crude oil from ACG is exported through the Baku–Tbilisi–Ceyhan pipeline to the Mediterranean Sea and the Baku-Supsa Pipeline to Supsa in Georgia, as well as through the Baku-Novorossiysk Pipeline to Novorossiysk in Russia. It is believed that there may also be untapped natural gas reserves under the ACG oilfields.
Media reports indicate that according to American Consulting Association IHS CERA (Cambridge Energy Research Associates), the Azeri–Chirag–Gunashli is the third largest oil-field development out of 20 listed. Total investment was estimated at US$20 billion as of 2009. As of 2008 reports, oil from the ACG fields accounted for approximately 80% of Azerbaijan's total oil production (exports and domestic consumption) and was expected to bring Azerbaijan potentially $80 billion in profits.

History
Exploitation of the Azeri–Chirag–Gunashli development started in the beginning of 1990s. In January 1991, the Azerbaijani government announced separate international tenders of exploration rights for Azeri, Chirag, and Gunashli fields. In June 1991, a consortium of Amoco, Unocal, British Petroleum, Statoil, McDermott, and Ramco was formed for a development of Azeri field. Azerbaijan was represented in the consortium by SOCAR. Negotiations were expanded to include all three fields. After Heydar Aliyev became President of Azerbaijan in 1993, talks with foreign companies were stopped and Lukoil was invited to the consortium. Negotiations resumed in 1994.  The production sharing agreement (PSA) was signed by the parties on 20 September 1994 for development of the fields for 30 years.  The day of the signing of PSA agreement is celebrated as The Day of Oilworkers in Azerbaijan.

At the first stage, the consortium started development drilling of the Chirag field in August 1997. First oil was produced in November 1997. This development stage was also known as the Early Oil Project (EOP). Originally, produced oil was exported through the Baku–Novorossiysk pipeline. A contract on the oil transportation via Russia to the Black Sea port of Novorossiysk was signed on 18 February 1996. The oil transportation through the pipeline started on 25 October 1997.  For the diversification of the export routes, construction of the Baku–Supsa Pipeline was agreed in 1996.  The pipeline became operational in 1998 and was officially inaugurated 1999. At the Chirag field, the water injection project was implemented in 1999 and the drilling technology was upgraded in 2000.

The second stage of the development consisted of the development of the Azeri field. The development of Azeri field started in 2002. Central Azeri living quarters arrived in Baku in July 2003 and drilling modules arrived in Baku in July 2003. The Central Azeri jacket was completed in March 2004. To accommodate addition oil, the Sangachal Terminal was upgraded in March 2003.  After installing the Central Azeri gas pipeline, the Central Azeri platform was launched in July 2004.  The platform was installed by October 2004, and production started in February 2005. The Central Azeri compression and water injection platform topsides was launched in July 2005. It injected first gas in May 2006

West Azeri drilling modules arrive in Baku in August 2004 and the platform launched in May 2005. The platform's topsides was installed  
in September 2005 and production started in January 2006. East Azeri drilling modules and quarters arrived in Baku in June 2005 and the platform was launched in March 2006. The topside was installed in March 2006 and the production began in October 2006.

The Deepwater Gunashli pre-drilling program started in December 2005. Drilling modules and quarters arrived in Baku in June 2006.  The platform became operational in April 2008.

On September 14, 2017, The Azerbaijan Government and the State Oil Company of the Republic of Azerbaijan (SOCAR), together with BP, Chevron, INPEX, Statoil, ExxonMobil, TP, ITOCHU and ONGC Videsh have signed an agreement to extend the PSA for ACG fields until 2049.

On April 19, 2019, SOCAR president Rovnag Abdullayev and BP’s regional president for Azerbaijan, Georgia, and Turkey, Garry Johns signed a contract cost $6 billion. The final investment decision on the Azeri Central East (ACE) platform, which is planned to be built on the Azeri–Chirag–Gunashli (ACG) block, has been adopted at the signing ceremony. The construction is scheduled to start in 2019, and the completion is scheduled for mid-2022.

Ownership
The founding consortium formed to develop the Azeri-Chirag-Gunashli project initially included BP, Amoco, Unocal, Statoil, McDermott, Turkish Petroleum, and Ramco Energy.

Lukoil sold its share in the project in 2003 to Inpex for $1.354 billion.

On 23 November 2009, Devon Energy announced it would sell its share in ACG.  On 29 March 2013, Hess sold its stake to ONGC for $1 billion.

In April 2020, Chevron sold all of its interest in Azeri-Chirag-Gunashli, including interests in the Western Export Route Pipeline and the Baku-Tbilisi-Ceyhan oil pipeline, to MOL Hungarian Oil and Gas PLC.

In 2018, and again in May 2020, ExxonMobil put its stake in Azeri-Chirag-Gunashli up for sale.

As of the first quarter of 2022, the participating shareholders of the Azeri–Chirag–Gunashli development were BP with a 30.37% stake, SOCAR (25.0%), MOL (9.57%), INPEX (9.31%), Equinor (7.27%), ExxonMobil (6.79%), TPAO (5.73%), Itochu (3.65%) and ONGCVidesh (2.31%). BP holds the major stake in the ownership and leads the AIOC consortium.

Under a 2017 agreement to extend the production sharing to 2049, the interest of SOCAR, the Azeri state energy company, increased to 25% while the interests of the other shareholders were reduced.

Production

With 3 stages completed and 7 operational platforms functional, total production from Azeri–Chirag–Gunashli was more than  a day in 2009. East Azeri (EA) had 13 wells in operation (9 of which are oil producers and 4 - water injectors) with an overall production  for the first three quarters of 2009.

Oil depletion rates of each of the Azeri–Chirag–Gunashli reservoirs are expected to differ over time, with aggregate output from the complex declining substantially after 2018.

The gas is supplied by BP free of charge. Azerbaijan received over 1 billion cubic meters of gas from these fields in the 1st quarter of 2009. Current recovery  comes to nearly 27 million cubic meters of casing head gas a day. A portion of gas is routed to national gas transportation system of Azerbaijan. Some is used as source of fuel at the platforms.

Casing head gas from platforms in central, western and eastern parts of Azeri field is supplied to Sangachal Terminal via 28 inch subsea gas pipeline to distributive system of Azerigaz CJSC to use on the local market.  A portion of casing head gas extracted at Chirag platform is directed to SOCAR's compressor station (the State Oil Company of Azerbaijan) to Oil Rocks field via 16 inch subsea gas pipeline. The rest of the gas from Azeri–Chirag–Guneshli platforms are pumped through intra field subsea gas pipeline to a platform for repeated pumping in a layer to support layer pressure. As of September 2009, 164.2 million tonnes of oil and 37 billion cubic meters of associated gas have been produced and 80.3 million cubic meters of water and 13 billion cubic meters of gas have been injected into layers since the beginning of production in ACG fields in 1997.

Routes of transportation
The oil from the ACG complex was pumped to Sangachal terminal south of Baku and from there routed to foreign markets by Baku-Supsa pipeline, Baku–Novorossiysk pipeline and Baku–Tbilisi–Ceyhan pipeline. An interactive map shows all current export routes.

See also

Baku–Tbilisi–Ceyhan pipeline
Baku-Supsa pipeline
Baku–Novorossiysk pipeline
Shah Deniz gas field
South Caucasus Pipeline
Sangachal Terminal

References

External links
Production Sharing Agreement for the Azeri-Chirag-Guneshli field
Image showing ACG fields

BP oil and gas fields
Oil fields of Azerbaijan
Oil fields of the Soviet Union
Caspian Sea